Kasturi is a 1980 Indian Hindi-language film directed by Bimal Dutt, starring  Nutan, Mithun Chakraborty, Parikshit Sahni, Sadhu Meher and Shreeram Lagoo.

External links
 
 *http://www.ibosnetwork.com/asp/filmbodetails.asp?id=Kasturi+(1980)

1980 films
1980s Hindi-language films
Best Hindi Feature Film National Film Award winners